Graphic Classics is a comic book anthology series published by Eureka Productions of Mount Horeb, Wisconsin. Graphic Classics features adaptations of literary classics by authors such as Arthur Conan Doyle, H. P. Lovecraft, and Edgar Allan Poe, with art by top professionals, many of whom hail from the underground or alternative comics world. Created and edited by Tom Pomplun, the series began publication in 2002.

Designed for ages 12 and up, 22 of the Graphic Classics volumes have been included in Diamond Comic Distributors list of recommended books for the American Library Association's Common Core Standards curricula.

Publication history
Graphic Classics was an outgrowth of Rosebud, a literary journal co-founded by Pomplun which also included comics. In 2002, Pomplun left Rosebud to start Graphic Classics. Because of budget restrictions, one of the first decisions Pomplun made was to restrict adaptations in the series to works in the public domain (e.g., those published before 1923).

The series started out in black-and-white; with vol. #17 (Science Fiction Classics, 2009) the books began being printed with full-color interior pages. Most volumes contain at least a few reprint of comics adaptations published by other companies, some going as far back as the 1970s. Six of the first eight volumes are in second editions (with the first volume, on Edgar Allan Poe, in its fourth edition), often with additional material than in the first edition.

Graphic Classics vol 6: Ambrose Bierce was nominated for the 2003 Bram Stoker Award for Best Illustrated Narrative.

Graphic Classics vol. 10: Horror Classics (2004) was the first volume focusing on a theme rather than a single author.

Eureka produced a special 68-page Free Comic Book Day Graphic Classics edition in 2008. It featured adaptations of Edgar Allan Poe's "The Black Cat," (adapted by Rod Lott and Gerry Alanguilan), Arthur Conan Doyle's "John Barrington Cowles" (adapted by Alex Burrows and Simon Gane), Lord Dunsany's "A Narrow Escape" (adapted by Milton Knight), Mary Shelley's "The Dream" (adapted by Antonella Caputo and Anne Timmons), and a  one-page Ambrose Bierce fable (illustrated by Mark Dancey).

Graphic Classics vol. 22: African American Classics (2011) was adapted and illustrated almost entirely by African American comics creators.

Titles

See also

Other comic book adaptations of literature:
 Classics Illustrated
 Marvel Classics Comics
 Marvel Illustrated
 PAICO Classics, Indian series similar to Classics Illustrated
 Pendulum Illustrated Classics, published by Pendulum Press

References

External links

 

 New York Times article on publishers releasing classic literature in comics form (May 2009)

2002 comics debuts
Comics based on fiction